Orchestral Manoeuvres in the Dark is the debut studio album by English electronic band Orchestral Manoeuvres in the Dark (OMD), released on 22 February 1980 by Dindisc. Recorded at the group's Liverpool studio, it showcased their minimal synth-pop style and peaked at number 27 on the UK Albums Chart. "Electricity" and "Red Frame/White Light" were released as singles; a re-recorded version of "Messages" provided OMD with their first hit in the UK, reaching number 13.

Much of the album's content centres around war themes, with OMD exploring "the lengths to which people would go in a situation beyond the norm". A sleeper hit, Orchestral Manoeuvres in the Dark met with favourable reviews and became a seminal record of its era. The band expressed dissatisfaction with their production efforts on the album, although frontman Andy McCluskey later came to appreciate its "naivety". It was remastered and re-released in 2003 with six bonus tracks, including the single version of "Messages".

Orchestral Manoeuvres in the Dark is also the title of a 1981 compilation album of tracks from this release and OMD's second album, Organisation, issued only in the United States.

Background
Rather than hire studio time to record the album, OMD co-founders Andy McCluskey and Paul Humphreys used their advance payment from Dindisc to build their own Liverpool recording studio, The Gramophone Suite. The duo predicted they would be dropped by the label due to disappointing sales, but would at least own a studio. McCluskey and Humphreys used cheaply-acquired instruments, as well as the low-end Korg M500 Micro-Preset (which had been paid for in many instalments). Their studio incurred leakage when the lead covering was stolen from its roof, and so McCluskey had to record his vocals under an umbrella.

Dindisc scheduled the album for release in February 1980, allowing three weeks for recording under the supervision of manager Paul Collister. The included tracks were composed during the previous four years: "Electricity" (McCluskey and Humphreys' first ever composition), "Julia's Song" and "The Misunderstanding" were holdovers from OMD precursor outfit the Id. A version of "Electricity" had been issued as OMD's debut single in 1979, and featured an early take of "Almost" as its B-side. McCluskey and Humphreys had to write two final songs, "Pretending to See the Future" and "The Messerschmitt Twins", "off the top of their heads" in order to complete the tracklist. Much of the content centres around war themes; McCluskey noted that the band were exploring "the lengths to which people would go in a situation beyond the norm".

Still generally a duo performing alongside a TEAC 4-track tape recorder christened "Winston", OMD enlisted Martin Cooper and Malcolm Holmes, the latter of whom had performed with McCluskey and Humphreys in the Id (both musicians would become full-time band members the following year). Cooper played saxophone on "Mystereality", while Holmes supplied percussion on "Julia's Song"; Dave Fairbairn played guitar on this track, as well as on "Messages". Kraftwerk, Neu! and Brian Eno served as key musical influences on the album, which showcased OMD's minimal synth-pop style. Biographer Johnny Waller described the finished record as "basically a studio version of their live set".

The group were dissatisfied with the production values of Orchestral Manoeuvres in the Dark, Humphreys stating, "We didn't know what the heck we were doing half the time." McCluskey, however, feels that "in hindsight it now has a naivety and charm, and is full of energy".

Artwork
The Orchestral Manoeuvres in the Dark sleeve was created by graphic designer Peter Saville and interior designer Ben Kelly, based on a door conceived by Kelly. It featured a die-cut grid through which the orange inner sleeve was visible. Saville and Kelly won a Designers and Art Directors Award for their work. McCluskey has praised the artwork, saying in 2019, "To this day, I think half the people bought [the album] for the Peter Saville sleeve."

McCluskey stated that OMD did not fully understand the royalty system at the time, and that the band "had a sleeve that cost us so much to manufacture that for every record we sold we were barely earning pennies". Carol Wilson of Dindisc disputed this, saying the cost to the band for the sleeve was contractually fixed and that the label took the expense.

Critical reception

Reviews of Orchestral Manoeuvres in the Dark were favourable. Paul Morley of NME wrote, "Orch Man's debut LP is one of the best of the year... How fine and different their melodies can be, how detailed and distinctive their song structures. It's much more varied and surprising, often exhilarating and always captivating, than dissenters claim this stuff can be." Sounds Des Moines proclaimed OMD to be "the most inventive of all the new Mersey[side] bands", while noting that they had "pulled off what is traditionally the biggest gamble in rock: playing totally engaging, satisfying music without the facility of the lead guitar". Red Starr of Smash Hits said, "An odd album from an odd duo, sometimes briskly clean synthesiser pop, sometimes strange and intriguing electronic excursions... Buy it and learn to love it."

Orchestral Manoeuvres in the Dark was hailed as a superior record within the contemporary synth-pop movement. In an enthusiastic review for The Face, Adrian Thrills contrasted OMD's "melodic immediacy" to the "nauseatingly self-conscious futuristic android pop of the [Gary] Numan/[John] Foxx automation acolytes", and declared the album to have "far more depth" than the Human League's Reproduction. Simon Ludgate of Record Mirror observed an emotional resonance that he felt was typically absent from synth-pop, while recommending the album for its "insidious rhythm and melody", and imagery that "will change at each play". In The Age, John Teerds viewed the record as "perhaps the best synthesiser-based music to emerge [in 1980]." It became the UK's 60th-best selling album that year.

In a retrospective appraisal, Trouser Press referred to Orchestral Manoeuvres in the Dark as "a demonstration of stylish electro-pop" with "a knack for melodies and hooks". Ned Raggett at AllMusic said of the record, "Its music is wonderful... there's both a variety and ambition present that never overreaches itself." Raggett also had praise for Saville's "brilliant die-cut cover". Pitchforks Scott Plagenhoef wrote that the album's "adventurous blend of drama and pathos—and its nods toward the more rhythmic end of Krautrock—elevated [OMD] above the [Brian] Eno/Kraftwerk template clung to by many of their peers." Dave Segal of The Stranger described the record as "a masterpiece of enchanting melodies, fascinating rhythms, and cherubic vocals".

Legacy
Joseph Burnett of The Quietus identified Orchestral Manoeuvres in the Dark as "one of the key early British synth-based pop/rock albums"; PopMatters critic Max Shand wrote that its "synthesizer bleeps disclos[ed] the way electronic music could avoid traditional song structures while still generating something buoyant." In addition to being named by contemporary reviewers as one of the finest records of 1980, Orchestral Manoeuvres in the Dark has appeared in subsequent lists of the year's best albums, with Radio X ranking it no. 1. Classic Pop readers voted it the 71st-greatest album of the 1980s, while the magazine's editorial staff ranked it 26th among the decade's best debut albums. KCMP listeners placed it at no. 291 in the "893 Essential Debut Albums".

Orchestral Manoeuvres in the Dark was a formative influence on electronic group Depeche Mode. Original bandleader Vince Clarke (who later founded Yazoo and Erasure) has cited the record as a key inspiration, with the track "Electricity" being his impetus to pursue a career in electronic music. OMD shared a TV studio with rock group ZZ Top during a promotional appearance for the album. ZZ Top subsequently purchased and publicly championed the record, and were inspired to incorporate synthesizers into their own work. Physicist and musician Brian Cox has cited the album as a major influence and one of his all-time favourites. Neil Tennant of Pet Shop Boys, another act influenced by OMD, declared Orchestral Manoeuvres in the Dark to be a "great" record.

Leftfield sampled "Almost" for their track "Snakeblood" (without attribution), which appeared on the soundtrack of The Beach (2000).

Track listing
All songs were written by Andy McCluskey and Paul Humphreys, except where noted.

Original release
Released on LP and compact cassette, the album was well-balanced for playback time, 18:23 on side A and 18:44 on side B.
A 1980 French cassette release, offered as part of Collection Chrome high performance line, is notable for using more expensive chromium dioxide tape instead of standard ferric oxide tape. This release quotes slightly different running times, 17:36 and 18:23 respectively.

US release (O.M.D.)
A 1981 US compilation, also using the band's name as the title of the release, collects material from the first two OMD albums, and uses a differently coloured, non-die cut version of the sleeve-art from the debut LP.

Remastered CD release with bonus tracks
Virgin / DIDCDR2

Personnel
 Andy McCluskey – voice, bass, keyboards, electronic drums, drum programming.
 Paul Humphreys – keyboards, voice, percussion, electronic drums, drum programming.

Additional musicians
 Malcolm Holmes – percussion on "Julia's Song"
 Martin Cooper – saxophone on "Mystereality"
 Dave Fairbairn – guitar on "Messages" and "Julia's Song"

Charts

Weekly charts

Year-end charts

Certifications

Notes

References

External links
 Album lyrics

1980 debut albums
Orchestral Manoeuvres in the Dark albums
Electropop albums